Walter B. Calvert (1904-1987) was a member of the Wisconsin State Assembly.

Biography
Calvert was born on December 23, 1904, in Benton, Wisconsin. He attended the University of Wisconsin-Madison and University of Wisconsin-Whitewater. Calvert died on February 1, 1987.

Career
Calvert was a member of the assembly from 1955 to 1964. He was a Republican.

References

People from Benton, Wisconsin
Republican Party members of the Wisconsin State Assembly
University of Wisconsin–Madison alumni
University of Wisconsin–Whitewater alumni
1904 births
1987 deaths
20th-century American politicians